Lieutenant General Javed Iqbal Ramday HI(M) is a retired general from the Pakistan Army who commanded the XXXI Corps. He was born in a well Known Arain Family.

Military career

Ramday served as GOC Swat during the First and Second Battle of Swat.

In 2011, Ramday was wounded while he was airborne when his helicopter came under fire in the Swat Valley.

In 2012, he joined the National Defence University in Islamabad, first as commandant and then as chief instructor in B-Division in 2013.

In August 2013, he was promoted to the rank of lieutenant general while he was serving as chief instructor in National Defence University. Shortly after, he was appointed as the President at the National Defence University where he served until 2015.

Ramday was appointed as the Corps Commander XXXI Corps in April 2015.

Often confused with namesake
He is often confused with Lt Gen Javed Iqbal who was charged with espionage and leaking "sensitive information to foreign agencies". Gen Ramday replaced Gen Javed Iqbal as Corps Cdr XXXI back in 2015.

Later Gen Ramday retired in 2016 and took over Fauji Fertilizer Bin Qasim Limited which he left in 2020.

He belongs to the infantry's Sindh Regiment.

References

Living people
Pakistani generals
Year of birth missing (living people)
Pakistani Muslims
Pakistani Sunni Muslims
20th-century Muslims
21st-century Muslims
Punjabi people
Recipients of Hilal-i-Imtiaz
Lieutenant generals